Nikolina Dijaković (born 3 May 1989) is a Bosnian football defender.

External links 
 

1989 births
Living people
Bosnia and Herzegovina women's footballers
Women's association football defenders
Bosnia and Herzegovina women's international footballers